Kota Kapur Inscription is an inscription discovered in western coast of Bangka Island, offcoast South Sumatra, Indonesia, by J.K. van der Meulen in December 1892. It was named after the village of the same name which is the location where this archaeological findings were discovered.

This inscription is using Old Malay language written in Pallava script. It was one of the oldest surviving written evidence of ancient Malay language. The inscription dated first day of half moon Vaiśākha on the year 608 Śaka (28 February 686 CE), mentioned about the curse of whoever committed treason against Srivijaya and the beginning of Srivijayan invasion against Java.

The inscription was first examined and dated by H. Kern, a Dutch epigrapher that worked for Bataviaasch Genootschap in Batavia. At first he thought that Srivijaya was the name of a king.

George Cœdès noted the name on the inscriptions was that of Srivijaya, a Buddhist kingdom in 638–86, "that had just conquered the hinterland of Jambi and the island of Bangka and was preparing to launch a military expedition against Java."  The name corresponds to Yijing's.

Content
Kota Kapur inscriptions is one of the five inscriptions edicted by Sri Jayanasa, the ruler of Srivijaya. Most of this inscriptions contains curse for crime, trespassing and treasons against Srivijaya. The contents was translated by Cœdès:

Transliteration

Translation
 Success ! (followed probably by cursing mantra formula that cannot be understood or translated)
 All oh thou gods almighty, all that gathered to protect Kadatuan (palace/kingdom) Srivijaya; all of thou gods that starts the beginning of the swear of all swear (curse)!!
 If in this lands, the realm under Kadatuan rule, there is a rebel, conspired with rebel, talk to rebel, and listen to rebel;
 know the rebel, dishonor, ungrateful, unfaithful to me or those whom I've appointed as datu; may all people that commit those deeds will die caused by curse or fell under expedition (war campaign) against them wage by a datu or led by several datus od Srivijaya, and let them;
 punished altogether with their clan and family. Moreover, let the evil deeds; such as disturbing other's soul, make other sick, cause people to suffer madness, using mantra (magic spell), poison, using upas (poison), tuba (poison), and ganja (marijuana),
 saramwat (?), pekasih (love charm), force themself upon others, and many other things, may all that deed will not succeed and strike back to those whom guilty for that evil deeds; may all die because of curse. Also those whom spread evil rumors to sway people.
 May those whom destroy the stone placed in this place also die because of the curse and directly punished. May all murderer, rebel, all of those ungrateful and unfaithful to me, all the performer of those deeds
 die because of curse. But for those whom obey and faithful to me and those whom I have appointed as datu, may all their efforts are blessed, also their clan and family
 with success, welfare, good health, freed from disaster, abundance everything for all their lands! In the year 608 Saka, first day of half moon Vaisakha (28 February 686), in that time
 this curse is said; the carving took place during the Srivijaya army just departed to attack Java, which is not submit to Srivijaya.

The inscriptions was carved on a pinnacle stone with several sides, with 177 cm height, 32 cm width on base and 19 cm width on top.

Significance
Kota Kapur inscription was the first Srivijayan inscription discovered, long before the discovery of the Kedukan Bukit Inscription on 29 November 1920, and before the Talang Tuwo inscription that was discovered several days earlier on 17 November 1920.

The Kota Kapur inscription, together with other archaeological findings in the region, was the testament of Srivijaya era. It has opened a new horizon and revealed the history of Hindu-Buddhist era in that area. This inscription also uncovered the ancient society inhabiting the region during 6th and 7th century that clearly shows Hindu-Buddhist influence.

See also 
 Kedukan Bukit Inscription
 Telaga Batu inscription
 Talang Tuwo inscription

References

Inscriptions in Indonesia
7th-century inscriptions
Malay inscriptions
Srivijaya
Bangka Belitung Islands
National Museum of Indonesia